Poşta or Posta may refer to several villages in Romania:

 Poşta, a village in Cilibia Commune, Buzău County
 Poşta, a village in Topliceni Commune, Buzău County
 Poşta, a village in Gohor Commune, Galaţi County
 Poşta, a village in Buturugeni Commune, Giurgiu County
 Poşta, a village in Cernica Commune, Ilfov County
 Posta, a village in Remetea Chioarului Commune, Maramureș County
 Poşta, a village in Frecăţei Commune, Tulcea County
Poșta Câlnău, a commune in Buzău County

Other meanings
 Posta River in Romania

See also 
 Poșta Veche (disambiguation)
 Posta (disambiguation)